KGPS-LP (98.7 FM) is a radio station licensed to serve Kingman, Arizona.  The station is owned by Calvary Chapel of Kingman. It airs a religious radio format.

The station was assigned the KGPS-LP call letters by the Federal Communications Commission on March 2, 2006.

References

External links
 Calvary Chapel of Kingman
 

GPS-LP
Radio stations established in 2008
Mass media in Mohave County, Arizona
GPS-LP
Kingman, Arizona
2008 establishments in Arizona
Calvary Chapel Association